Engineers Without Borders – USA (EWB–USA) is a non-profit humanitarian organization. It is the U.S. national group representing the larger international Engineers Without Borders in the U.S. It involves the implementation of sustainable engineering projects, while involving and training engineers and engineering students.

History

Engineers Without Borders – USA (EWB-USA) was born from a chance meeting of Bernard Amadei (a professor of civil engineering from the University of Colorado Boulder), and Angel Tzec (a representative of the Belize Ministry of Agriculture). Tzec's village in Belize was in a difficult situation because it had no running water or sanitation. Tzec invited Dr. Amadei to visit his village in Belize, where he saw how laborious a task it was for the villagers to gather water. "I came across little girls who had to carry water back and forth to the village all day, so they couldn't go to school", Amadei says. "I knew that as a civil engineer, there had to be something I could do."

In 2002, Amadei returned with eight University of Colorado Boulder students and a local civil engineer, also from Boulder. With the help of the local community, they installed a clean water system powered by a waterfall in the area for less than $15,000. It was from this experience that Dr. Amadei came to see that he could utilize professional and student engineers to improve the quality of life in other development projects around the world.

Awards
In 2010, EWB–USA received the Henry C. Turner Prize for Innovation in Construction Technology from the National Building Museum. In a statement from the prize jury, by Art Gensler said, "This organization gives locals hope and talented engineering professionals the opportunity to share their knowledge with countries that can so greatly benefit from their efforts."

References

External links

 

USA
Non-profit organizations based in Colorado
Organizations established in 2000
American Society of Civil Engineers
Development charities based in the United States